A traitor is a person who commits treason.

Traitor, The Traitor or Traitors may also refer to:

Films 
 Traitor (film), a 2008 spy thriller starring Don Cheadle
 The Traitor (1936 German film), the English title for the film Verräter directed by Karl Ritter
 The Traitor (1936 American film), directed by Sam Newfield
 The Traitor (1957 film), a British film noir
 The Traitor (2019 film), an Italian film

Literature 
 Traitor (Star Wars novel), a 2002 novel by Matthew Stover
 The Traitor (Dixon novel), a 1907 novel by Thomas Dixon Jr., and a 1908 dramatization of it
 The Traitor (Walters novel), a 2002 Guy Walters novel
 The Traitor (play), a 1631 play by James Shirley
 The Traitor (1718 play), a play by Christopher Bullock, reworking Shirley's original
 The Traitor, a 2007 fantasy by Michael Cisco
 The Traitor, a 2007 spy thriller by Stephen Coonts
 The Traitor Baru Cormorant, a 2015 fantasy titled The Traitor in the UK
 Traitor (Daisley novel), a novel by Stephen Daisley

Music 
 Traitors (album), by Misery Index
 "Traitor" (song), by Olivia Rodrigo
 "Traitor", a song by Motörhead from Rock 'n' Roll
 "Traitor", a song by Renegade Soundwave from Soundclash
 "The Traitor", a 1985 song by Minimal Compact

Television

Series
 Traitor (TV drama), a 1971 British television play by Dennis Potter
 Traitors (TV series), a 2019 British miniseries

Episodes
 "Traitor" (American Horror Story)
 "Traitor" (Captain Scarlet)
 "Traitor" (The Secret Circle)
 "Traitor" (The Transformers)
 "The Traitor" (Voltron)
 "The Traitor" (G.I. Joe: A Real American Hero)

Other uses
 Traitor (Thieves' World), a 1982 fantasy role-playing game adventure for Thieves' World

See also
 Traiteur (disambiguation)
 The Traitors (disambiguation)
 Treason (disambiguation)
 Treta, a Sanskrit word relating to Hinduism